Phi Lambda Kappa is a professional medical fraternity that was founded at the University of Pennsylvania in 1907.

History
The fraternity, founded as a local of this same name in 1907 at the University of Pennsylvania, grew into a national of 41 chapters and 4,800 members as of 1977.

The fraternity evolved through consolidation, becoming what it termed "the eastern branch" of an expanded Phi Lambda Kappa by adding Aleph Yodh He, a national formed in 1908 which it then called its western branch. Aleph Yodh He had been formed at the University of Illinois at Chicago in 1908, and by the time of the merger had chartered nine chapters and claimed 350 members.  A third fraternity joined this consolidation, the local chapter named Zeta Phi Mu at Loyola of Chicago, which had been established in 1912 (earlier?).  These moves were an outcome of a planned consolidation of Jewish medical fraternities. The amalgamation produced a combined twelve chapters as the outcome of its organizational meeting in Pittsburgh in 1922; some of these may have combined where existing at the same school. The names Aleph Yodh He and Zeta Phi Mu were retired in 1922, the organization taking the national name of Phi Lambda Kappa.

In 1924, policy was changed to allow graduate members to hold national office.

At the 1952 convention, the constitution was altered to make the fraternity non-sectarian.

Symbols 
The fraternity's badge is diamond-shaped with a field of blue.  In the upper corner of the field is a skull and crossbones, filled in white. The letters  are set in gold at the midline, and below these is a six-pointed star, also filled in white.  The corners of the badge are set with rubies, and the sides with pearls - four pearls on each side.

The colors of the society are blue and white.

Chapter list 
Chapter is list from Baird's 19th. edition (1977), reprinted in the 20th edition. Active chapters, as of that date, are listed in bold; inactive chapters in italics.

See also 
List of Jewish fraternities and sororities
Professional fraternities and sororities

References

Historically Jewish fraternities in the United States
Professional medical fraternities and sororities in the United States
Former members of Professional Fraternity Association
Jewish organizations established in 1907